Mighty Machines is a Canadian educational children's television series that teaches about machines and how they work. The show premiered in 1994 airing 39 episodes over three seasons in 1994, 2004, and 2008.

Format
Each Mighty Machines episode focuses on a specific type of heavy equipment or work environment. Machines talk to viewers on screen to explain their jobs. Documentary footage of actual machines in action doing their day-to-day work is presented with voiceovers of the machines addressing the viewers. The children in the audience are invited to follow the machines during a typical day. They explain their abilities and their duties in detail over the course of the episode. Each machine is given its own personality and they often hold conversations with one another as they work. Unlike most documentary-style shows, there is no external narrator.

All of season 1 episodes were done in two formats for the airing: 22-minute full episodes and five-minute excerpts for use as filler.

Honours
Mighty Machines was nominated for a Gemini Award in 1996 in the category of "Best Children's Program or Series".

Production
Mighty Machines first aired as a production of Malofilm, the first season in 1994, second in 2004, and third in 2008 (done by Loten Media, and distributed by Seville Pictures). Most of the episodes were filmed in Toronto, Ontario; Montreal, Quebec; Halifax, Nova Scotia; and Roanoke, Virginia, U.S.

Telecast and home media
The show aired on TVO, Treehouse TV and other channels in Canada, including Access in Alberta, the Saskatchewan Communications Network in Saskatchewan, and Knowledge in British Columbia. It also aired on Discovery Kids in the United Kingdom in 2005, on the now-defunct Qubo in the U.S. until August 31, 2014, and a French-language version airs on TFO in Ontario and on channels in Quebec.

The episodes were put on direct-to-video tapes released by the Disney-owned Buena Vista Home Video in the U.S.

All of the first three seasons' episodes are available on VHS and DVD, individually or in box sets. There is also a 60-minute VHS featuring all of the five-minute episodes from season 1.

DVD releases
 Chomp! Crunch! Tear! features episodes: Car Wreckers, Giant Tow Trucks, and Laying Down the Pipeline
 Tremendous Tools features episodes: On the Farm, At the Sawmill and Deep Underground
 Winter Blast features episodes: In the Snowstorm, At the Ski Hill and In the Forest
 Revved Up features episodes: Building an Airplane' , 'Ride the Mountain Rails and Reach for the Sky
 Diggers and Dozers features episodes: At the Construction Site, At the Demolition Site and At the Quarry
 Machines on the Job features episodes: Bringing In the Harvest, At the Steel Mill and Hot off the Press
 Big Wheels Rollin features episodes: At the Cement Yard, Building a Truck and Trucks, Trucks, Trucks
 Lights and Ladders features episodes: At The Fire Hall, At the Garbage Dump and In the City
 Roadways to Runways features episodes: At the Race Track, At the Airport and On the Road
 Boats to the Rescue features episodes: To the Rescue, Making Waves and In the Harbor
 All About Garbage and Recycling features episodes: All About Recycling and at the garbage dump
 Making Tracks features episodes: At the Train Yard, Making a Road and Buses subways, and trains
 Mega Machines features episodes: Go, Boats, Go, Machines Go to School, Under the Waves, Board the Ferry, and All About Recycling Learning, Lifting, and Towing features episodes: Machines go to School, Reach for the Sky! and Giant Tow Trucks Planes, Trains, & Automobiles features episodes: Building an Airplane, Ride the Mountain Rails, and Car Wreckers
 Ships Ahoy features episodes: Under the Waves, Go boats go, and Board the ferry
 Producing the Goods Features Episodes: Bringing In The Harvest, At The Steel Mill, Hot Off The Press, And Laying Down The Pipeline 
 Smash, Mash, and Crash features: 13 mini episodes

List of episodes

Season 1 (1994) – Malofilm / Seville Pictures
1. At The Airport

At Toronto Pearson International Airport, DC, a Canadian Airlines DC-10 jet, explains (and shows) his journey from the hangar to the terminal, before picking up passengers and taking to the sky. He also shows the viewers how he gets cleaned in the hangar. Many other aircraft are featured in the episode including a Canadian Airlines Boeing 737 (misnamed as an A320) who carries a talking suitcase named Sammy, a British Airways, Air Canada, and Lufthansa Boeing 747, an American Airlines Boeing 757 and a few others. Behind the scenes an airport tug called Tuggy, a fuel tanker, and a people mover also explain their jobs. This episode is the series premiere.

2. At The Quarry

Euclid, a Euclid R170 quarry dump truck shows how he and his brother Ernie, also a Euclid R170 quarry dump truck are loaded with rocks by LeTourneau, a LeTourneau L-1100 front end loader and bring the rocks from the quarry to a rock crusher turning them into gravel. A gravel conveyor brings the gravel to a gravel pit where an unnamed Volvo BM L180 front end loader loads the gravel into trucks that deliver the gravel to where it's needed.

3. In The City

Little Mac, a small municipal first-generation Chevrolet S-10 pickup truck, from Toronto’s Public Works takes viewers out onto the streets of Toronto to show how the city streets are cleaned. The featured machines that do this include a street sweeper named Dusty who scrubs the roads, a vacuum truck named Vacuum Vic who cleans out sewers, a street sprinkler named Gusher that sprays water on the pavement, Stumper, a mobile chainsaw that obliterates stumps, and a boom truck named Stretch with a shredder named Chipper, who trim trees, all of which are to prepare the streets every morning for traffic. At the yard, a front end loader named Jaws picks up the street garbage to load onto The Dump Truck Brothers to take to the dump. The main location is the public works city garage.

4. In The Harbour

Murphy, a Toronto Police boat, takes viewers out into Toronto Harbour to show many of his harbour friends, including Blackie and Thor, two large freighters; William Lyon Mackenzie, a fireboat; and Flo and Merryweather, a couple of ferry boats Oriole, a Toronto city tours boat; a working replica of a square rigger ship and the two ferries that go to Toronto Island, all of which explain their use of operating in the harbour. Cranes named Hook and Claw play a role in unloading ships. Murphy speaks with an Irish accent.

5. At The Construction Site

Big Cat, a Koehring excavator shows viewers how he and his friends help build a hospital from digging the foundation to building the walls. Big Cat’s job is digging the foundations. In Downtown Toronto, two tall cranes named SkyHook and Carmen help build a skyscraper that is almost finished (same skyscraper in the episode At The Cement Yard). Other members of the construction company include Putt Putt, a front loader, who piles up small loads of dirt, Treads, a bulldozer, who flattens the grounds, Lurch, and Charlie, Two Concrete Mixers, who bring in concrete to fill the foundations, Little Brother, a stationary wheeled crane who lifts the walls, Skinny, a telescopic forklift who can only carry stuff in small areas, and George, a dump truck, who brings dirt to the site for possible roads.

6. At The Race Track

2 versions of this episode exist.

Original Version

Blue, a Reynard 94I race car (driven by Jacques Villeneuve) shows viewers how race cars are transported to races, how race cars are prepared before a race, qualifying, making pits stops, and racing against the other competitors. The race in the original version took place on July 17 1994 during the 1994 Molson Indy Toronto at Exhibition Place in Toronto, Ontario. Michael Andretti won the race.

Alternate Version

Goldstar, a Van Diemen RF92 Formula Ford race car (driven by Martin Roy) shows viewers how race cars are transported to races, how race cars are prepared before a race, qualifying, making pits stops, and racing against the other competitors. The race in the alternate version took place at Circuit Mont-Tremblant in Mont-Tremblant, Quebec. Alex Tagliani won the race. Goldstar is voiced by Arthur Holden.

This version replaced the original version in circulation because the original version had alcohol and tobacco company sponsors in the episode and was deemed inappropriate to be seen by the show's target audience.

7. At The Demolition Site

Dino, a Caterpillar hydraulic shear excavator shows viewers around the demolition site and how he demolishes an old factory building with his shears. Crane, a stationary truck crane lifts out pipes and a motor from the building. Dozer, a tracked loader smooths the roads in the demolition site. Dynamite is used to collapse two water towers and a tall concrete chimney. Mack arrives to pick up the scrap metal from the demolition site. Grapple, a Komatsu hydraulic claw excavator loads scrap metal into Mack. This episode was filmed at the former St. Lawrence Starch Company factory in Port Credit, Mississauga which was located at Hurontario Street and Lakeshore Road East.

8. At The Train Yard

Two Canadian Pacific SW1200RS switchers and a Canadian National GP38-2 road switcher named Shunty, Diesel and Freddie explain how work goes on in the train yard, including switching, putting the cars on the right train and transporting materials long distances. Spike and the tie gang do maintenance on the rails to keep them safe for the trains to run on.

9. At The Fire Hall

King, a Mack ladder truck shows viewers how his ladders and tiller work, while Pumper, a pumper truck shows how the hoses work. Sparky, a fire hydrant supervises them and delivers water for the hose practice. The episode also features some members of the North York Fire Department doing their training exercise. This was before North York merged into Toronto.

10. On The Road

Big Hoss, a Peterbilt 379 semi-trailer truck shows viewers how he gets hooked up to a refrigerated trailer then he takes viewers out on the road as he travels to a Husky truck stop to get his fuel tanks filled up, deliver empty pallets, and pick up carrots to deliver them to the grocery store. Forky, a forklift truck unloads the empty pallets out of Big Hoss's trailer. Little Joe, a forklift truck loads carrots into Big Hoss's trailer. Big Hoss speaks with a Texan accent. This episode was filmed in Greater Toronto mainly in Bradford, Ontario.

11. At The Garbage Dump

A garbage truck named Trasher explains his job of moving garbage from house to house. Later Muriel, Whitey & Biffy, garbage trucks along with Little Dozer, a tracked loader and Hooper, a front end loader explain the operations of the transfer station showing how garbage is pushed down a chute and compacted into large semi trailers used for garbage transfer after the trailer of garbage is picked up by Big Red, a garbage transfer truck the story is continued at the dump. Big Red, two bulldozers named Scoop and Pee-Wee,Kristoff, a tractor scraper and Spike a compactor explain how the landfill works. Scoop and Pee Wee spread the garbage out after big red dumps. Spike squashes the debris, Kristoff scrapes off the dirt and dumps it, and Pee Wee finishes it by smoothing the dirt out. The main location is the landfill at Toronto Municipality.

12. At The Cement Yard

Big Boy, a cement mixer truck shows viewers how concrete is made and what concrete is used for. The cement yard receives a load of sand and gravel from hopper trucks which dump their loads into grates, the gravel is taken by conveyor belt and the different sizes of gravel are sorted into piles. Sally, a front end loader keeps the gravel piles in the yard tidy. Big Boy is loaded with concrete and takes his load to replace a road while Tiny, also a cement mixer truck takes his load of concrete to a skyscraper under construction (same skyscraper in the episode At The Construction Site).

The first six episodes of season 1 were written by Doug Atkinson and Fiona Zippan (Denzey), while the remaining episodes were written by Bryan A. Auld. The voice actors of season 1  are Loredana Cunti, Tim Brown, Jennifer Martin, Noah Segal, Joel Cohen, Greg Blanchard, Gord Rutherford, Claire Rothman, Arthur Holden, John Metcalfe, Steve Murphy.

Season 2 (2004) – Seville Pictures

For season 2, the scripts were by Bill Freeman, and the voice actors were Edward Daranyi, Santo Lupo, Christopher Quinn, Patte Rosebank, Tanya Schneider, Chuck Vollmar, Alan Bacchus, Suzanne Hersh, Oliver Svendsen, and Hannah Cheesman.

13. In the Snowstorm

Buzz, Stretch, and Ranger, a snow removal crew in Montreal, go out to clear the streets after a big snowstorm. The different tasks involved in this process are detailed by Blower, a snowblower machine, Bobcat, a Bobcat loader, Casey, a backhoe loader, Grader, a motor grader and Big Dude, a snowplow.

14. Deep Underground

Ranger, Scoop, Cutter, Driller, Scaler and Crusher, a series of machines operating in a salt mine, explain how to find the salt, scoop it up, and carry it to the surface of the mine. Ranger, a jeep inspects while Driller pokes holes for explosives, Cutter digs the opening of the mine, Scoop, a front loader picks up the rocks, Scaler, a wheeled continuous mining excavator with a wall scraper scrapes off all of the salt. Loader then dumps it into Dumper.  After all the salt has been dug up, it gets loaded on a conveyer belt into a cargo ship named Selene to be taken to the public works to be used for icy roads. This was filmed in Goderich Harbour, Ontario at the Sifto Canada salt mine on Lake Huron.

15. At the Ski Hill

A number of snowmobiles and other ski hill machines explain how they are able to skim across the surface of the snow without getting stuck. All the groomers are busy at nighttime when the skiers have gone home because it is very dangerous when skiers are around while they work. This episode was filmed in Mont Tremblant, Quebec.

16. In The Sky!

A blue and yellow biplane named Stearman visits an airshow. All helicopters report on what goes on at the air show. Old fashioned and modern-day airplanes make an appearance in this episode.

17. In the Forest

Feller, a Feller Buncher machine, explains how he cuts only marked trees in the forest. Skidders then explain how they skid logs to the log loader, which demonstrates its agility between loading logging trucks.

18. At the Sawmill

At a busy sawmill, Jaws, a front-end loader, explains how the trees are turned into lumber and what he does with the cut logs. His friends Cat, Grapple, Buzz, Scoop, and Big Red are many of the other machines that explain how the lumber will soon be turned into wood. Chip truck comes to collect all the chips to be made into paper.

19. All About Recycling

Gus, A recycling truck explains how he collects all the recycling and sends it through many other machines, so it can be reused again. Big Blue, the sorting machine, shows how all the recycling is compacted. Kurt, a skid steer shovels it up. You also get to see how metal is recycled in a junk yard, and how asphalt to make a road can be recycled too.  At the Junk Yard, the operations are explained by Greg, a grapple truck, at the road repair site, Chewy, a pavement profiler, slimy, an asphalt paver, and roller,an asphalt roller work together. The episode was filmed in Toronto, Ontario and Burlington, Ontario.

20. Building A Truck!

A number of machines explain and show how much work it takes to build a truck. The episode is hosted by Pete, a tractor unit who was built in the factory. This episode was filmed in Chatham. The plant was closed sometime in 2011.

21. Making Waves!

Skipper takes viewers into Halifax Harbour, and while meeting many ferries, cargo ships, and navy ships, he shows how waves were formed.

22. Making A Road

Sammy, an excavator, explains how a new road is built and prepared for vehicles to drive over. Tommy, an articulated dump truck dumps the dirt. Bulldozers, Scrapers, and Soil Compactors, help out with the foundations, then the asphalt crew lays down the road. Dozer, a bulldozer, and the scrapers level the ground, then Packer, and Rolland, two soil compactors flatten the ground. Roxy and Mack, two gravel dump trucks dump piles of gravel, Rocky, another bulldozer levels down the gravel, with help from Gary, a grader, and Biggest Heaviest Roller. There is also footage down at an Asphalt plant, where Lea, a front loader dumps crushed stones into a chute to make the asphalt. Jock, a dump truck brings the asphalt to the site, Lenny, a Paver, and Rod, a roller flatten it all down.

23. On the Farm

Allis a tractor explains how he must pull Polly, a plowing machine, to keep the fields ready for farming.

24. To the Rescue!

Sambraro, a coast guard lifeboat, and a rescue lifeboat explains how they recover a man overboard from stormy seas. Hercules, a fireboat is his Lieutenant.

25. Trucks, Trucks, Trucks!

Vehicles include a gas truck, a carnival truck, and a cement pumper truck.

26.  Buses, Subways, and Trains!

Various public transport vehicles are featured in this episode, including Buddy, an OC Transpo bus, Clara, and Neville, two streetcars, an O-Train, a GO Train and a Toronto subway train, who in turn explain their jobs of picking up the passengers and dropping them off exactly where they want to be.

Season 3 (2008) – Loten Media / Seville Pictures
For season 3, the voice actors are Chris Quinn, Kim Godfrey, Shawn Colin, Todd Schick, Dave Crichton, Blair Bailey, Nick Tracey, Colin Kirley, Suzanne Hersh, Wesley Cudlip, Bill Freeman, Derek Pert, Joe Pillitteri, and Chandra Wohleber.

27. Building An Airplane

JetGirl comes to visit the airport and tells her story why she left and was made.

28. Ride The Mountain Rails

Diesel locomotive number 95 dumps rocks in the Canadian river, while three White Pass trains take people on a tour to see the mountains. This was the only episode filmed outside Canada. It was filmed in Skagway, Alaska, White Pass, and Carcross, Yukon.

29. Car Wreckers

Forks, a forklift shows children what he does in the car scrap yard. This episode was filmed in Ontario notably in Guelph.

30. Laying Down The Pipeline

Excavator, an excavator, shows how he digs deep in the ground for pipelines that are to be installed. His friends show how pipelines are connected and installed into the ground.

31. At The Steel Mill

Slab haulers and other machines show how steel is made. The cast includes a Slab Hauler named Stevie and his friend Sami, also a Slab Hauler. Benny, a Bulldozer piles up fresh coal at the yard near the building, Scott, a Scraper scoops up the coal and dumps it from his bin into the chute to be made into coke. Electro, a magnetic crane picks up the steel to load them onto train cars. Pusher, and Quencher work inside the steel mill plant, and Luke, the locomotive pulls the cars away so that the steel can be sold. This episode was filmed at ArcelorMittal Dofasco in Hamilton, Ontario.

32. Hot Off The Press

Charlie, a printing press and other printing machines show how the Toronto Star newspaper is made. The other machines include Stuffer, who inserts 'supplements', like brochures and coupons into newspapers, Bundler, who packs up the newspapers, and the machines which print onto metal sheets the design of a page so it can be transferred onto newsprint.

33. Giant Tow Trucks

Brutus, a Tow Truck shows viewers all of the gear he carries to different jobs and with the help of another tow truck they pull a tanker that has tipped over.
 
34. Bringing In The Harvest

A group of tractors retrieve tomatoes from the farm and put them into the Factory. Also features Clipper, who clips grapes and a truck who brings them to a factory to make wine.

35. Reach For The Sky

Stretch, a mobile crane, is going to replace an AC on the top of a tall building, with a little help from another crane, Little Brother. Stretch is ready to make the big lift while Gipsy Lady a Sikorsky s64 sky crane helps change ac units on the roof of a factory.

36. Machines Go To School

Backhoes, bulldozers, and other machines go to school to learn about how to dig, push dirt, carry dirt, and other construction procedures. This episode was filmed in Morrisburg, Ontario.

37. Go, Boats, Go!

Features a Canadian Coast Guard hovercraft, "Fast Forward", a Floridian air boat, and "Empress" a modern paddle wheel cruise ship.

38. Under The Waves

Features an Underwater tour Submarine who wants the tour passengers to see the Coral Reef, and a Submersible which goes underwater to find something for the boss, and a Navy Submarine who takes kids to see what's inside.

39. Board The Ferry

The Spirit of Vancouver Island, a BCFerries ferry, shows the kids what happens at the dock, the controls of the ship, and other things on the ship (Final episode).

External links
 NCircle Entertainment: Buy Mighty Machines DVDs

Treehouse TV original programming
1990s Canadian children's television series
2000s Canadian children's television series
TVO original programming
Television series by Entertainment One
1994 Canadian television series debuts
2008 Canadian television series endings